Parliamentary elections were held in Iran on 8 March 1996, with a second round on 19 April. The Combatant Clergy Association and its allies emerged as the largest bloc in the Majlis, winning 110 of the 270 seats.

Electoral system
The constitution approved in a December 1979 referendum provided for a 270-seat Majlis, with five seats reserved for minority groups including Jews, Zorastrians, Armenians from the north and south of the country and one jointly elected by Assyrians and Chaldeans.

The elections were conducted using a two-round system, with the number of candidates progressing to the second round being double the number of seats available. Candidates required an absolute majority to win a seat in the first round, and plurality to win in the second round. However, in this election, minimum percentages for candidates to be elected in first round was lowered to 33.33% (one-third of votes).

Campaign
A total of 3,726 candidates contested the elections, including around 326 women. 145 seats were won in the first round of voting.

Main groups contesting in the elections were:
 Combatant Clergy Association and Islamic Aligned Organizations ('traditional' right-wing)
 Executives of Construction Party ('modern' right-wing)
 Association for Defence of Revolution Values ('neocon' right-wing)
 Association of Combatant Clerics ('traditional' left-wing)
 Coalition of Imam's Line groups ('radical' left-wing)
15 Freedom Movement members presented themselves as candidates and only 4 of them made it through initial vetting, 3 of whom were excluded before polling day. The organization announced its intention to withdraw from the election. The election was boycotted by the National Front and Nation Party.

Results

Both conservatives and reformers claimed a 70 percent majority after the first round and also claimed independents as supporters.
Salam newspaper
According to Salam, Executives of Construction and Imam's Line Groups won shared 120 parliamentary seats.
Adelkhah (1999)

 Nohlen et al (2001)
In the following table, the Independents are counted as "allies".

 Kazemzadeh (2008)

Aftermath
The newly elected members of Majlis met for the first time on 1 June. Ali Akbar Nateq-Nouri remained in Speaker position until 2000 after he received 11 more votes than Abdullah Nouri (also a cleric).

References

1996 elections in Iran
March 1996 events in Asia
April 1996 events in Asia
Islamic Consultative Assembly elections
Iran